The Bawdies is a Japanese rock band signed to the Seez Records label and the Getting Better sub-label of Victor Entertainment. The band is heavily influenced by 1950s-1960s beat music and early rhythm & blues styles of music.

Background
Band members Roy Watanabe, Jim Kimura, and Marcy Yamaguchi became friends as children, and met fourth member Taku "Taxman" Funayama while in high school. Watanabe discovered The Sonics, a 1960s American garage band, which influenced his musical tastes. The band was formed on New Year's Day in 2004. Starting in 2006, as of September 2011 the band has released five full-length albums. The band has been compared to The Beatles is some news stories.

English "modfather" Paul Weller reportedly was impressed with the band's third album This Is My Story, released in April 2009. The album reached # 1 on the iTunes Store rock chart and # 4 on the J-Pop album chart soon after its release. The album was their first album release with Victor Entertainment, and Naoki Sato of Love Psychedelico oversaw production.

In January 2010, the band received the favorite Japanese act award at the CD Shop Awards.  Also in 2010, the band's single "Just Be Cool" reached #8 on the Oricon chart, and #5 on the Japan Hot 100.  The "Hot Dog" single made it to #7 and #3, respectively.

In April 2011, the band's single "Love You Need You" peaked at #3 on the Japan Hot 100. For the single's title track, the band collaborated with singer and rapper Ai.

The band played at the Budokan in November 2011, and a live CD of the performance is to be released in March 2012.

In February 2012, the band's single "Rock Me Baby" rose to number 6 on the Japan Hot 100 chart. The song was also selected to be the theme song of the new Japanese television drama "Hungry!" (ハングリー!).

Members
 Roy - Lead vocals, bass guitar
 Taxman - Guitar, backing vocals
 Jim - Guitar, backing vocals
 Marcy - Drums

Discography

Albums

Singles

Vinyl releases
 "I Beg You" (2007)
 Awaking of Rhythm and Blues (2008)
 "Emotion Potion" (2009)
 This Is My Story (2009)
 "It's Too Late" (2009)
 "Hot Dog / The Whip" – The Bawdies and Locksley (2010)
 There's No Turning Back (2010)
 "Keep You Happy / Sweet & Still" – The Bawdies and Riddim Saunter (2010)
 "Just Be Cool" (2010)
 "Love You Need You" featuring Ai (2011)
 Live the Life I Love (2011)
 "Red Rocket Ship" (2011)
 "Rock Me Baby" (2012)
 "Lemonade" (2012)

Video albums
 Live at AX20101011 (2010)
 Keep On Movie (2011)
 Live at Budokan 20111127 (2012)
 Space Shower TV Presents The Bawdies a Go-Go!! 2010'' (2012)

References

External links

 
 Official blog 

Japanese rock music groups
Musical groups established in 2004
Musical groups from Tokyo